Ken Hogan (24 July 1951 – 24 May 1992) was an Australian rules footballer who played with Essendon in the Victorian Football League (VFL). Hogan later played for Sandy Bay in Tasmania, East Perth in the West Australian Football League (WAFL), Brunswick in the Victorian Football Association (VFA), and coached Old Ivanhoe Grammarians in the Victorian Amateur Football Association (VAFA).

References

External links 		
		

Essendon Football Club past players profile
		
		
		
		
1951 births		
1992 deaths		
Australian rules footballers from Victoria (Australia)		
Essendon Football Club players
Sandy Bay Football Club players
East Perth Football Club players
Brunswick Football Club players